Leopold Anhalt-Dessau may refer to:

Leopold I, Prince of Anhalt-Dessau (1676–1747)
Leopold II, Prince of Anhalt-Dessau (1700–1751)
Leopold III, Duke of Anhalt-Dessau  (1740–1817)
Leopold IV, Duke of Anhalt-Dessau (1794–1871)